Centruroides baracoae is a species of scorpion in the family Buthidae.

References

baracoae
Animals described in 1976